Illela is a department of the Tahoua Region in Niger. Its capital lies at the city of Illela.As of 2011, the department had a total population of 366,704 people.

References

Departments of Niger
Tahoua Region